Leonard John Kosinski is a United States Air Force lieutenant general who serves as the director for logistics of the Joint Staff. He previously served as the deputy commander of the Fifth Air Force from 2020 to 2022.

In April 2022, Kosinski was nominated for promotion to lieutenant general and appointment as director of logistics of the Joint Staff.

References

External links

Year of birth missing (living people)
Living people
Place of birth missing (living people)
United States Air Force generals